Fairfield Preparatory School is a fee-paying independent mixed preparatory school in Loughborough, Leicestershire, England. It is one of four private schools operated by the Loughborough Schools Foundation, along with Loughborough Grammar School for boys, Loughborough High School for girls and Loughborough Amherst School for girls and boys.

Fairfield is a strong academic school with the majority of pupils going on to attend secondary public schools or high performing independent schools. It serves primarily as the preparatory feeder school for Loughborough Grammar School for boys and Loughborough High School  for girls, with a number of boys and girls also joining or Loughborough Amherst School, however many also go on to attend the surrounding public schools including Ratcliffe College, Trent College, Oakham School, Repton School and Uppingham School. All four of the Loughborough Endowed Schools are autonomous, and yet they share the same vision and educational ethos, supported by a united board of governors. The catchment area for Fairfield is large due to the school's popularity with children travelling from Loughborough and the surrounding villages and from as far as Leicester, Nottingham, Rutland and Derby.

The school's oldest building, Fairfield House was built in 1823 by a family of wealthy and influential hosiery manufacturers known as the White family who left in 1893. Later the building was bequeathed to the school and after initially being used as the site for the Loughborough Endowed School's girls junior department it became an integral part of the present Preparatory School. Like many similar preparatory schools there is a house system of four houses that in addition to the Housemaster have both a House Captain and a Games Captain.

References

It serves as a feeder for England's public schools including one of the nation's oldest public schools, Loughborough Grammar School.

Preparatory schools in Leicestershire
Loughborough